Ulrik Bolt Jørgensen (born 1964) is a Danish film and television producer, and since 1992 founder and CEO of Arena Film (DK). From 2003–2016 he served as Film Commissioner of Copenhagen and was one of the driving forces behind the establishment of the Copenhagen Film Fund. Bolt Jørgensen is developing and producing international TV-series with a strong Scandinavian spine, as well as feature films. As a film commissioner, Bolt Jørgensen was involved in Tom Hooper's The Danish Girl, and Wallander, starring Kenneth Branagh.

Career 
Ulrik Bolt Jørgensen graduated from the National Film School of Denmark as a Creative Producer in 1991 and established his own production company 'Arena' in 1992, from where he produced film with director Lars Hesselholdt a.o. He later created the company 'Angel Arena' together with IT entrepreneur Mogens Glad, aimed at developing, producing and distributing major Scandinavian films and TV series, such as Misery Harbour (1999) starring Nikolaj Coster-Waldau and Leïla (2001) by director Gabriel Axel.

In 2003, Ulrik Bolt Jørgensen was serving the organization Copenhagen Capacity as the head of the Film Commission in Copenhagen, aimed at attracting foreign film and television series to the Greater Copenhagen area. While being Film Commissioner, Bolt Jørgensen was involved in the movie The Danish Girl (2015), and the television series Wallander (2008–2016) starring Kenneth Branagh and Midsomer Murders (1997–present), which shot their 100th episode in Copenhagen. Additionally, during his time as Film Commissioner, Bolt Jørgensen was a part of the establishment of the Copenhagen Film Fund.

In 2016, Ulrik Bolt Jørgensen re-established his production company Arena Film ApS situated in the Greater Copenhagen area, focusing on bringing Scandinavian stories to a global market.

Filmography

References

External links 
 Ulrik Bolt Jørgensen on Internet Movie Database
 Ulrik Bolt Jørgensen interview with Variety

1964 births
Living people
Danish film producers
Danish television producers